KJAL (585 AM) was a radio station broadcasting a Religious radio format. Licensed to Tafuna, American Samoa, it served the American Samoa area.  The station was owned by Asia Pacific Media Ministries and licensed to the District Council of the Assemblies of God in American Samoa.

The station signed on in 2002 as WDJD but was forced by the FCC to change to a "K" callsign to conform with most other U.S.-licensed radio stations located in the Pacific. The station was assigned the KJAL call letters by the Federal Communications Commission on September 12, 2002.

The station had filed an application with the FCC to change its licensed broadcast frequency from 585 kHz to 630 kHz.

The station's license was cancelled by the FCC on February 1, 2014 for failure to file an application for license renewal.

References

External links
 FCC Station Search Details: DKJAL

JAL
Radio stations established in 2002
2002 establishments in American Samoa
Defunct religious radio stations in the United States
Radio stations disestablished in 2014
Tafuna, American Samoa
2014 disestablishments in American Samoa
Defunct mass media in American Samoa